1-Nitropyrene is a by-product of combustion and is the predominant nitrated polycyclic aromatic hydrocarbon (pyrene) emitted in a diesel engine.  1-Nitropyrene is listed as an IARC Group 2B carcinogen, indicating it is possibly carcinogenic to humans.

References

Nitro compounds
Pyrenes
IARC Group 2B carcinogens